The jihadist insurgency in Niger or Islamist insurgency in Niger is a civil conflict between the government of Niger and Islamist groups.

The attacks that took place in Niger were a series of attacks by militants on civilians and soldiers, mainly in the western region of Tillabéri. The attacks left 611 dead and more than 114 others injured in 2021. The attacks began in 2016 and intensified in 2021.

Background
Several major attacks occurred in Niger between the 2010s and 2020. 
The Niger faces jihadist insurgencies both in its western regions (as a result of the spillover of the Mali War) and in its southeastern region (as a result of the spillover of the islamic insurgency in Nigeria). The insurgency in the west of the country began with incursions in 2015 and intensified from 2017 onwards, with massacres carried out by groups affiliated with al-Qaeda and the so-called Islamic State. In its southeastern regions, nevertheless, the Niger mainly fights Boko Haram insurgents.

Timeline

2021 
It is also the first year in which attacks were carried out with frequency in the country. Attacks were carried out every month of 2021. The previous biggest attack in Niger against civilians was the 12 December 2020 Toumour attack, which resulted in 28 people killed. Both the December 2020 and January 2021 attacks were carried out during Niger's municipal and regional elections, while the February bombing specifically targeted members of the electoral commission.

January
On 2 January, the villages of Tchombangou (at ) and Zaroumdareye (at ), which are seven kilometres apart, were attacked by several militants. The attack initially left 79 people dead and 75 wounded. Of the deceased victims, 49 were killed in Tchombangou and 30 in Zaroumdareye. A day after the attack, 21 more people were found dead and others succumbed to their injuries on Tchombangou, bringing the total death toll to 100. On 8 January UN's High Commissioner for Refugees spokesman said that 73 people had been killed in the village of Tchouma Bangou and 32 in Zaroumdareye, making the total death toll 105. The government of Niger dispatched soldiers to the border after the attacks. The attackers are Islamist militants who arrived in the villages while crossing the border from Mali.

Some time before the massacre, two Islamist militants who were seen in the area were killed by the local villagers. Those attacks are suspected to be in retaliation for those killings, according to the country's interior minister.

February
On 21 February, seven members of the electoral commission were killed and three others injured in a landmine explosion in Tillabéri. The attack was carried out on the same day of the presidential election's second round.

March 
On 16 March, armed men on motorcycles attacked a convoy returning from a market in Banibangou by the Malian border to a nearby village in Southwestern Niger's Tillabéri Region, killing 58 people.

On 21 March, militants riding motorbikes attacked Intazayene, Bakorat and Wistan, three villages in the Tahoua Region close to the Malian border, killing 137 people. The death toll would make the attack the deadliest committed by suspected jihadists in Niger's history. Newly elected President Mohamed Bazoum condemned the attacks and declared three days of national mourning.

On 24 March, at least 10 people were killed during attacks at two villages in the Tillabéri Region.

April
On 18 April, at least 19 civilians were killed and two wounded when armed men raided a village in Tillabéri Region.

May
On 3 May, a military patrol was ambushed in the Tahoua Region, resulting in the killing of 16 soldiers and the wounding of six more. It was the first attack against soldiers in the country since the beginning of the year.

On 12 May, five villagers were killed and two more wounded after militants stormed the village of Fantio, in the Tillabéri region, during Eid al-Fitr celebrations.

On 30 May, four civilians and four soldiers were killed during a raid carried out by Boko Haram militants in the town of Diffa, in the Diffa Region. The jihadists attacked the town in the late afternoon, riding in about 15 vehicles, but were pushed back by responding security forces during a long gunfight, in which six attackers were killed.

June
On 25 June, armed men attacked a village and nearby locations, killing a total of 19 civilians. Initially, the attackers stormed the Danga Zawne village, in the Tillabéri region, killing three people. They then attacked nearby farms, killing the other sixteen people.

On 29 June, Boko Haram fighters opened fire on a bus along the road between Diffa and Maine Soroa, killing four civilians, including the bus driver, two villagers and a village chief; two more were wounded. The fighters then moved on another road and opened fire on a group of soldiers, wounding six of them. A gunfight erupted, and thirteen terrorists were killed.

July
On 2 July, around 100 heavily armed “terrorists” riding motorcycles attacked the Tchoma Bangou village, killing four civilians. Security forces responded to the attack, starting a gun battle, resulting in the death of five soldiers and 40 terrorists.

On 25 July, fourteen people were killed and one more was wounded as gunmen stormed the village of Wiye. Nine of the victims are killed while working at fields.

On 28 July, 19 civilians were killed and five more wounded as militants stormed the village of Deye Koukou in the Banibangou area, near the border with Mali.

August
On 1 August, Islamist militants ambushed and opened fire on a group of soldiers in Torodi, Tillabéri Region. As the soldiers were escaping and carried the wounded, a bomb exploded. Fifteen soldiers were killed in the attack, while six more are missing.

On 16 August, gunmen on motorbikes stormed the village of Darey-Daye, Niger, opening fire against civilians while they were tending their fields, killing 37 people, including 14 children.

On 20 August, gunmen opened fire against civilians who were praying at a mosque in the village of Theim, in the Tillaberi region, killing 16 people.

On 25 August, hundreds of Boko Haram militants attacked a military post in Diffa, killing 16 soldiers and wounding nine others. In the ensuing gun battle, around 50 Islamist insurgents were killed.

October
On 11 October, ten people were killed and another was wounded when gunmen opened fire at a mosque in the village of Abankor.

On 18 October, gunmen opened fire against a police station in Tillaberi, killing three policemen and wounding seven others.

On 20 October, six members of Niger's national guard were killed and several others were wounded when gunmen ambushed a convoy carrying the prefect of Bankilare and his bodyguards, who escaped unharmed.

November
On 2 November, Islamic State in the Greater Sahara gunmen attacked a delegation led by the mayor of Banibangou, killing 69 people. The mayor and the leader of a self-defence militia were among those killed.

On 4 November, fifteen soldiers were killed as gunmen attacked a military outpost in the village of Anzourou.

December 
On 5 December, hundreds of motorcycle-equipped rebels raided an international military base in Tillabéri, killing 29 soldiers. 79 of the invaders were killed.

United States involvement

See also 
Jihadist insurgency in Burkina Faso

References

Civil wars involving the states and peoples of Africa
Islamism in Niger
Terrorism in Niger

Diffa Region
Tahoua Region
Tillabéri Region